Edith Kellman (April 4, 1911, Walworth, Wisconsin – May 11, 2007, Walworth, Wisconsin) was a noted American astronomer who is known for her work on the Yerkes system of stellar classification, also called the MKK system.

Early life and education
Edith Kellman was born on April 4, 1911 in Walworth, Wisconsin to Ludvig and Ellen Levander Kellman. Kellman attended Wheaton College in Wheaton, Illinois.

Career
Kellman worked at the Yerkes Observatory as a photographic assistant, where she worked with William Morgan and Philip Keenan to develop the Yerkes system, an influential system of stellar classification. The MKK classification system was introduced in 1943 and was used by Morgan, Keenan, and Kellman to map the spiral structure of the Milky way using O and B stars. A variation on this system is still used today in stellar classification.

After leaving the observatory, she taught mathematics at Williams Bay High School until her retirement in the 1970s.

References

American women astronomers
Wheaton College (Illinois) alumni
1911 births
2007 deaths
20th-century American women scientists
People from Walworth, Wisconsin
20th-century American scientists
21st-century American women